Crago was the head of an Alamannic sippe who supposedly founded the town of Creglingen in Germany in the late fourth or early fifth century.  His name apparently means crow.

References
Creglingen Walking Tour

Alemannic people
4th-century Germanic people
5th-century Germanic people